#1 Girl is the debut studio album by American boy band Mindless Behavior. It was released on September 20, 2011, by Interscope Records and Streamline. The album debuted at number 7 on the US Billboard 200, with first-week sales of 36,000 copies in the United States. To date, the album has sold 290,000 copies, and spinning its sales for more than 5.5 million ringtones and it contains with these singles that has sold 845,000 copies, while it had ranked over 160 million views via YouTube.

Singles

The album's lead single, titled "My Girl" was released on August 24, 2010. The song was Record production, and was written by Walter Millsap III and Hallway Productionz. The song charted at number 16 on the US Hot R&B/Hip-Hop Songs chart. The remix to "My Girl", which features guest vocals from Young Money rapper Tyga and his label-mate Lil Twist, along with the American singer-songwriter Ciara.

The album's second single, titled "Mrs. Right", which features guest vocals from American rapper Diggy Simmons, was released on June 28, 2011. The song charted on the US Billboard Hot 100 at number 72 and on the US R&B/Hip-Hop Songs chart at number eight. The remix of "Mrs. Right" features guest vocals from UK's rapper Chipmunk. The video for the remix was added to VEVO. It is the same one as the original, except it was edited to completely omit the verse by Diggy Simmons and its intro, however, Chipmunk does not make the appearance in the video.

The album's third single, "Girls Talkin' Bout" was released on November 1, 2011. The song charted at number 50 on the US Hot R&B/Hip-Hop Songs chart.

The album's fourth single, "Hello" was released on March 8, 2012.

Track listing
Credits for #1 Girl

Personnel

Musicians
Craig Crippen Jr.
 Chresanto August
 Rayan Lopez
 Jacob Perez
 Boi-1da – Bass, Drums
Candice "Goldie" Nelson – Vocals
Diggy Simmons – Rap
DJ Break – Percussion
Jerry Williams – Guitar
Matthew Burnett – Bass, Keyboards
Walter Millsap – Vocals
Walter W. Millsap III – Vocals
DJ Soundwave – Personal DJ

Production
Aaron Miller – Assistant Engineer
Alex Teamer – Producer, Programming, Sequencing & Editing
Anthony Saleh – Management
Boi-1da – Producer, Programming, Sequencing & Editing
Candice "Goldie" Nelson – Composer, producer
Chris Galland – Assistant
Cliff Feiman – Producer
Dana Hammond – Producer, Programming, Sequencing & Editing
Dave "Diz Mix" Lopez – Assistant Engineer
Dave Hyman – Assistant Engineer
Dave Russell – Mix Engineer
David Russell – Mix Engineer
Erik Madrid – Assistant, engineer, Mixing
Gregory "Yung Billionaire" Watts – Producer, Programming, Sequencing & Editing
John "Styles Amillie" Millsap – Producer, Programming, Sequencing & Editing
Jukebox – Producer, Programming, Sequencing & Editing
Kam Sangha – Producer
Kenneth Crear – Management
Kevin McCall Jr. – Composer
Keisha R. Gamble – Composer, Management
Lamar Van-Sciver – Composer, producer, Programming, Sequencing & Editing
M. Samuels – Composer
Manny Marroquin – Mixing
Marcus De'Andre Walker – Composer, producer, Programming, Sequencing & Editing
Matthew Burnett – Producer
Nathaniel Williams – Producer, Programming, Sequencing & Editing
Nelson Jackson III – Producer, Programming, Sequencing & Editing
P. "J. Que" Smith – Composer
Staci Yamano – Management
Troy Carter – Management
Vincent Herbert – Executive Producer
Vito Orlando – Recording Engineer
Walter Millsap – Arranger, Assistant Engineer, composer, Executive Producer, Management, producer, Producer – Vocals, Programming, Sequencing & Editing, Recording Engineer
Walter W. Millsap III – Arranger, Assistant Engineer, composer, Executive Producer, Management, producer, Producer – Vocals, Programming, Sequencing & Editing, Recording Engineer

Charts

Weekly charts

Year-end charts

Release history

References

2011 debut albums
Albums produced by Boi-1da
Mindless Behavior albums